Mitar Vasiljević (born 25 August 1954) is a Bosnian Serb who was convicted of crimes against humanity and violation of the laws or customs of war by the International Criminal Tribunal for the Former Yugoslavia (ICTY) for his actions in the Višegrad region during the Bosnian War. He was a member of Milan Lukić's White Eagles paramilitary group.

He was charged with six counts of crimes against humanity and four counts of violations of the customs of war, all of which he pleaded not guilty to. While he was originally scheduled to be tried along with Milan and Sredoje Lukić, his case proceeded on its own as the others were still at large at the time.

Vasiljević was found guilty on four charges and was sentenced to twenty years' imprisonment, which was reduced to fifteen years after an appeal. He was incarcerated in Austria.

On 12 March 2010, Vasiljević was granted early release.

See also
 Višegrad massacres
 Uzamnica camp
 Milan Lukić

References

External links
 ICTY Case Sheet
 ICTY Amended Indictment
 ICTY Judgment

1954 births
Living people
People from Višegrad
People convicted by the International Criminal Tribunal for the former Yugoslavia
Bosnia and Herzegovina people imprisoned abroad
Prisoners and detainees of Austria
Serbs of Bosnia and Herzegovina convicted of crimes against humanity